Naskar  is an Indian surname and may refer to

Anukul Chandra Naskar, Indian politician
Subhas Naskar, Indian politician
Jayanta Naskar, Indian politician
Gobinda Chandra Naskar, Indian politician
Gour Naskar, Indian footballer
Purnendu Sekhar Naskar, Indian politician